Noah Williams (born February 28, 2001) is an American college basketball player for the Washington Huskies of the Pac-12 Conference. He previously played for rival Washington State. He is the son of former Washington State player Guy Williams.

Early life and high school career
Williams was born and raised in Seattle, Washington and went to high school at the nearby O'Dea High School.

Recruiting
Williams originally committed to Buffalo under head coach Nate Oats on March 10, 2019. After Oats left Buffalo to accept the head coaching position at Alabama, Williams decommitted from Buffalo and committed to Washington State on May 7, 2019 over Buffalo, Virginia Tech, and Washington.

College career
Williams played in 29 games, starting 13, and averaged 6.2 points and 21.7 minutes per game in his freshman season. He scored 15 points on his 19th birthday against Washington and a seasonhigh 17 points against Oregon State for his best performances of the season.

During his sophomore season, Williams broke his careerhigh points several times. He broke it in backtoback games, scoring 32 points in a win against California and scoring 40 points in a tripleovertime win against Stanford, marking the first time anyone from Washington State had scored 40 points since Klay Thompson scored 40 during the 2011 Pac-12 Conference Men's Basketball Tournament. For the season, he averaged 14.1 points and 30 minutes per game while starting all 27 games.

Coming off of his muchimproved sophomore season, he averaged 9.5 points and 25.7 minutes per game in 35 games. He scored a seasonhigh 19 points against both Winthrop and Oregon. On April 11, 2022, Williams transferred from Washington State to rival Washington.

Personal life
Prior to the start of his junior season, Williams was involved in an altercation at a bar and was charged with misdemeanor. He pled guilty to the charge on March 10, 2022.

Career statistics

College

|-
| style="text-align:left;"| 2019–20
| style="text-align:left;"| Washington State
| 29 || 13 || 21.7 || .366 || .148 || .722 || 3.5 || 1.9 || 1.1 || .3 || 6.2
|-
| style="text-align:left;"| 2020–21
| style="text-align:left;"| Washington State
| 27 || 27 || 30.0 || .406 || .379 || .804 || 3.6 || 2.7 || 1.6 || .2 || 14.1
|-
| style="text-align:left;"| 2021–22
| style="text-align:left;"| Washington State
| 30 || 25 || 25.7 || .332 || .262 || .716 || 3.1 || 2.2 || 1.1 || .3 || 9.5
|- class="sortbottom"
| style="text-align:center;" colspan="2"| Career
| 91 || 65 || 25.7 || .368 || .307 || .747 || 3.4 || 2.3 || 1.2 || .3 || 9.8

References

External links
Washington State Cougars bio

2001 births
Living people
American men's basketball players
Basketball players from Seattle
Shooting guards
Washington State Cougars men's basketball players